Mufti Mukarram Ahmed is an Indian Muslim religious and literary scholar. Ahmad is the Shahi Imam (Royal prayer leader) and Khateeb (Prayer leader and main speaker) of Shahi Masjid Fatehpuri Mosque, India's second largest mosque. He was born in a Uyghur family.

Mufti Mukarram subscribes to the Barelvi school of Sunni Islam which is adhered to by a vast majority of Indian as well as Pakistani Muslims in the sub-continent. He is a scholar of Arabic, Urdu, Persian, English and Hindi and a Ph.D. in Modern Arabic Literature. He represents Muslims (Ahle Sunnat) on issues such as moon sighting and Eid celebration. It is the Oldest Committee of Delhi. Mufti Mukarram also represents Khankahe Aalia Naqshbandiya and he is Murshide Tariqat Silsila Nakshbandiya Mujaddidiya, Chishtiya, Qadriya and Sohr-wardiya. He has written several books on Islamic teachings.

His views on contemporary issues
 Mob Lynching
Maulana Dr. Mufti Mohammed Mukarram Ahmed condemned mob lynching and demanded immediate action accused the government of not taking immediate action against mob lynching.
Citizenship Amendment Act 2019
He supported protests against new Indian citizenship law and said that Protest is the only way of conveying our voice to the government. Any intensified protest will make people in power think about its impact on citizens.

References

External links
Home page 
Profile of Shahi Imam Mufti Muakkrram Ahmad

Indian Sunni Muslim scholars of Islam
Indian imams
Living people
Barelvis
Year of birth missing (living people)
Sufism